Clan Macpherson is a Highland Scottish clan and a member of the Chattan Confederation.

History

Origins

The Scottish Gaelic surname for Macpherson is Mac a' Phearsain which means son of the parson. The Celtic church allowed priests to marry and the progenitor of the chiefs of Clan Macpherson is believed to have been a man named Muireach or Murdo Cattenach who was the priest of Kingussie in Badenoch. The Clan Macpherson is part of the Chattan Confederation (Clan Chattan). In 843 the chief of Clan Chattan was Gille Chattan Mor and one of his sons, the first chief of Clan Macpherson was forced to resettle in Lochaber by Kenneth MacAlpin, first king of Scots. The chief could have been the lay prior of Ardchattan and he seems to have been named in honour of Saint Cathan. Touch not the cat bot a glove. 'Bot' means without. The 'glove' of a wildcat is the pad. If the cat is 'ungloved', its claws are unsheathed. The motto serves as a warning that one should beware when the wildcat's claws are 'without a glove'. It is a reference to the historically violent nature of the clan and serves as a metaphorical warning to other clans that they should think twice before interfering with Macpherson business.

Macpherson clan traditions is that in 1309 Robert the Bruce offered the lands of Badenoch to the chief of Clan Macpherson if they destroyed the Bruce's enemies, the Clan Comyn, and the Macphersons carried out the king's wishes. The Clan Macpherson is sometimes known as the Clan of the Three Brothers owing to the fact that chief Ewan Ban Macpherson had three sons: Kenneth Macpherson of Clunie, Iain Macpherson of Pitman and Gillies Macpherson of Invereshie.

14th-century clan conflicts

In 1370 the Battle of Invernahavon took place between the Chattan Confederation and the Clan Cameron. There was a dispute between the Macphersons and another clan of the confederation, the Clan Davidson over who should take the right wing in the battle. The Clan Mackintosh, whose chiefs were also chiefs of the Chattan Confederation favoured the Davidsons and as a result the Macphersons left the field of battle. The Clan Cameron took advantage of this situation and gained the upper hand, however the Macphersons were eventually coerced back into the battle and the Camerons were defeated. The feud between the Clan Cameron and Chattan Confederation continued for many years after and in 1396 the Battle of the North Inch took place, which was watched by Robert III of Scotland and his whole court.

The Black Chanter
According to Clan Macpherson lore, at the end of the battle, a piper appeared in the sky, played a few notes and then let the pipes fall to the ground, where, being made of crystal they broke; all except the chanter, which, being of wood only cracked. The Clan Chattan piper then seized the chanter and began playing.  This Black Chanter  is kept at the Clan Macpherson Museum in Newtonmore.

16th century and Glenlivet

Prior to the Battle of Glenlivet in 1594 which was fought between Protestant forces under the Earl of Argyll and Catholic forces under the Earl of Huntly, Argyll had laid siege to Ruthven Castle which was well defended by the Clan Macpherson who were vassals of Huntly's and so Argyll had to give up the siege.

17th century and civil war

In 1618 Andrew Macpherson, eighth chief of Clan Macpherson acquired the abbey-castle grange in Strathisla. Andrew's son, Euan Macpherson supported the royalist cause during the Scottish Civil War and fought for James Graham, 1st Marquess of Montrose. The tenth chief was Duncan Macpherson of Cluny who in 1672 lost his claim to lead the Chattan Confederation. The Privy Council of Scotland instead found in favour of a Mackintosh. Duncan had no sons and in 1722 was therefore succeeded as chief of Clan Macpherson by Lachlan Macpherson, fourth Laird of Nuid.

18th century Jacobite uprisings

Clan Macpherson having supported the Jacobite rising of 1715, General Wade's report on the Highlands in 1724, estimated the clan strength at 220 men. Chief Euan Macpherson of Cluny was a notable leader in the Jacobite rising of 1745 and fought at the Clifton Moor Skirmish. 300 Macphersons took part in the Atholl raids of March 1746. After the Jacobite defeat at the Battle of Culloden, Cluny was able to escape capture by government troops for nine years even though a reward of £1000 was offered for his capture. He escaped to France in 1755. William Macpherson, who was killed at the Battle of Falkirk (1746), is the ancestor of the current Chief of Clan Macpherson. His brother witnessed government "red coats" burning Macpherson of Cluny's house. Duncan Macpherson of Cluny fought in the British Army during the American Revolutionary War.

Castles

Cluny Castle, about five miles south-west of Newtonmore in Strathspey was a stronghold of the clan. The original castle dated from the fourteenth century but was razed by the Duke of Cumberland after the Jacobite rising of 1745 which the Macphersons had supported. The present Cluny Castle is in fact a nineteenth century mansion that was built on the site of the original stronghold.
Ballindalloch Castle was built by the Clan Grant and owned by the Ballindallochs before coming to the Macphersons, now the Macpherson-Grants.
Newton Castle, Blairgowrie, Perthshire is the current seat of the Macpherson chiefs.
Invereshie House, near Kingussie, Strathspey was held by the Macphersons from the fourteenth century. William Macpherson of Invereshie captured Blair Castle from the Marquess of Montrose in 1644.
Pitmain House, near Kingussie, Strathspey was held by the Macphersons from the fourteenth century. The present building forms part of the Highland Folk Museum.

See also
Macpherson, list of people with the surname
Scottish clan

References

External links
Official Clan Macpherson website
Clan Macpherson Museum Website
Official Clan Chattan Association website
Virtual Museum exhibition on the Macpherson Family of Badenoch and Carnamah
 Macpherson Tartans